Igești may refer to several villages in Romania:

 Igești, a village in Blăgești Commune, Vaslui County
 Igești, a village in Țifești Commune, Vrancea County

and to:
 Igești, the Romanian name for Yizhivtsi Commune, Storozhynets Raion, Ukraine